Khonk-e Pir Sabz (also Romanized as Khonk-e Pīr Sabz; also known as Khong-e Pīr Sabz and Pīr Sabz) is a village in Rostam-e Yek Rural District, in the Central District of Rostam County, Fars Province, Iran. At the 2006 census, its population was 157, in 27 families.

References 

Populated places in Rostam County